Jiang Mengjie (born 7 December 1989) is a Chinese actress. She is best known for her role as Lin Daiyu in 2010 television series The Dream of Red Mansions.

Personal life
Jiang was born in Wuhu, Anhui on December 7, 1989. She was a graduate of Beijing Dance Academy.

Filmography

Film

Television series

Variety show

References

External links

1989 births
People from Wuhu
Living people
Chinese television actresses
Chinese film actresses
21st-century Chinese actresses
Beijing Dance Academy alumni
Actresses from Anhui